This is the list of diplomatic missions based in Jakarta, Indonesia.

As the capital city of Indonesia, Jakarta hosts a number of embassies and missions of foreign countries and entities that have established diplomatic relations with Indonesia. Currently, the capital city of Jakarta hosts 106 embassies and several other countries accredit non-resident ambassadors from other capitals. In Jakarta, a large concentration of foreign embassies and missions are clustered around Central Jakarta (Menteng area and across Jalan MH Thamrin), and South Jakarta (across Jalan Jenderal Sudirman, Jalan H.R. Rasuna Said, and Mega Kuningan area).

Jakarta serves both as the official capital and the seat of Association of Southeast Asian Nations (ASEAN) Secretariat. While several countries established dedicated mission to ASEAN in Jakarta, a number of embassies in Jakarta are also accredited as the official mission to ASEAN.

Embassies

Missions to Association of Southeast Asian Nations (ASEAN)

Other Missions

See also

 List of diplomatic missions in Indonesia

References 

 
Foreign relations of Indonesia
Embassies of Jakarta
Embassies